Clive Darren Allen (born 20 May 1961) is an English former professional footballer who played as a forward for seven different London clubs. Allen was a prolific striker throughout his career. 

In 1986-87 he won the PFA and Football Writers' Association player of the year awards. He also won 5 caps for England from 1984 to 1988.

Early life
Clive Allen was born in Stepney, London on 20, May 1961. His father, Les Allen,  was a member of Tottenham Hotspur's Double-winning team of 1960–61. His younger brother, Bradley Allen, and cousins Martin and Paul Allen also played football professionally.

Club career

Queens Park Rangers
He started his career at Queens Park Rangers in the late 1970s, and scored 32 league goals in 49 appearances, before moving to Arsenal.

Arsenal
Allen signed for Arsenal in the summer of 1980 for a fee of £1.25m. He did not play a competitive match for the club, although he did play three pre-season matches. He soon moved on to Crystal Palace in a swap deal with Kenny Sansom.

Crystal Palace
Allen was Palace's top scorer for the 1980–81 season with nine goals in the league and 11 in all competitions, when Palace finished bottom of the First Division.

In one of his earliest games for the club, Allen was at the centre of a notorious incident in the defeat against Coventry City on 6 September 1980, his shot flying into the goal and rebounding from the stanchion holding up the netting so quickly that it was ruled not a goal, the referee mistakenly ruling that the ball had hit the frame of the goal. Highlights of the match being televised by the BBC, the incident was captured on camera.

Return to Queens Park Rangers
QPR, still in the Second Division, were now managed by Terry Venables (who had signed Allen for Palace) and in Allen's first season back at the club (1981–82) he scored 13 Second Division goals, though not enough to win promotion. QPR also had their most successful FA Cup run, reaching the final for the first time with Allen scoring the goals in 1–0 victories in both the 6th Round (vs Crystal Palace) and semi-final (vs West Bromwich Albion). Allen was injured in the final against Tottenham Hotspur and subsequently missed the replay.

Over the next two seasons, Allen scored 27 League goals as QPR first won the Second Division Championship in 1982–83 and then finished fifth in the First Division in 1983–84. He moved to Tottenham for a £700,000 fee.

Tottenham Hotspur
Allen scored twice on his debut on 25 August 1984, a 4–1 away win at Everton, and scored 10 goals from 18 appearances in his first season, in which Spurs finished third behind Liverpool and Everton.

In 1986–87 he scored 33 League goals, and 49 goals in all competitions, a record for the club. He scored, but was on the losing side alongside his cousin Paul Allen, in the 1987 FA Cup Final. That season he also won the PFA Player of the Year and Football Writers' Association Footballer of the Year awards.

Bordeaux
He moved from Spurs to join Bordeaux in March 1988, scoring 13 goals in 19 league games.

Later career
In July 1989 he joined Manchester City, who had just been promoted to the First Division. He scored 10 league goals in his first season, but only four goals in 1990–91. He managed three appearances and scored twice in the league for City the following season, and was transferred to Chelsea in December 1991.

He scored seven goals in 16 games over the next three months with Chelsea, scoring the winning goal in an FA Cup fourth-round tie against Everton. He then joined West Ham United in March 1992, scoring once in four league games, but was unable to stop them from being relegated.

He scored 14 goals in the 1992–93 Division One campaign as West Ham were promoted as runners-up. His goal on the last day of the season, against Cambridge United, secured promotion to the Premier League. He played just seven league games in the 1993–94 in the new Premier League scoring two goals, against Sheffield Wednesday in August 1993. He played his final game for West Ham in March 1994 in a 0-0 FA Cup sixth-round game at Upton Park against Luton Town, coming on as a substitute for Lee Chapman.

In January 1994, when Allen was out of favour at West Ham United, Tottenham manager Ossie Ardiles (who had been his Tottenham teammate the previous decade) expressed interest in bringing Allen back to White Hart Lane as he looked to spend up to £500,000 on buying a striker to cover for the injured Teddy Sheringham, but the transfer did not happen.
Allen opted to drop down a division and join Millwall for a fee of £75,000.

He ended his career with three league games for Carlisle United in 1995–96.

International career
In the summer of 1984, Allen was given his first England cap against Brazil. In total he made five appearances for England without scoring.

American football career
In 1997, he played for the London Monarchs in NFL Europe.

Personal life
His son Oliver is also a footballer. In 2019, Allen published his autobiography, Up Front: My Autobiography. Allen also works as a commentator on ESPN and BT Sport predominantly for coverage of Ligue 1, Bundesliga, FA Cup, and UEFA club competitions.

References

External links

1961 births
Arsenal F.C. players
English expatriate sportspeople in France
Carlisle United F.C. players
Chelsea F.C. players
Crystal Palace F.C. players
Association football forwards
England international footballers
England under-21 international footballers
England youth international footballers
English expatriate footballers
English football managers
English footballers
Expatriate footballers in France
First Division/Premier League top scorers
FC Girondins de Bordeaux players
Ligue 1 players
Living people
London Monarchs players
Manchester City F.C. players
Millwall F.C. players
Footballers from Stepney
Premier League managers
Premier League players
Queens Park Rangers F.C. players
English Football League players
Tottenham Hotspur F.C. managers
Tottenham Hotspur F.C. non-playing staff
Tottenham Hotspur F.C. players
West Ham United F.C. players
American football placekickers
English players of American football
Footballers who switched code
Clive
English autobiographers
English association football commentators
FA Cup Final players